The Leoncio Prado Province is one of eleven provinces of the Huánuco Region in Peru. The capital of this province is the city of Tingo María.

The province was named after the Peruvian mariner Leoncio Prado Gutiérrez.

Boundaries
North: San Martín Region
East: Ucayali Region
South: Puerto Inca Province, Pachitea Province and Huánuco Province
West: Marañón Province, Dos de Mayo Province, Huacaybamba Province and Huamalíes Province

Political division
The province is divided into six districts, which are:

 Daniel Alomías Robles (Pumahuasi)
 Hermilio Valdizán (Hermilio Valdizán)
 José Crespo Y Castillo (Aucayacu)
 Luyando (Naranjillo)
 Mariano Dámaso Beraun (las Palmas)
 Rupa-Rupa (Tingo María)

Ethnic groups 
The province is inhabited by indigenous citizens of Quechua descent. Spanish is the language which the majority of the population (91.42%) learnt to speak in childhood, 8.23 	% of the residents started speaking using the Quechua language (2007 Peru Census).

See also 
 Pumarinri

Sources 

Provinces of the Huánuco Region